Bondan Winarno (29 April 1950 – 29 November 2017) was an Indonesian writer and journalist with a variety of skills. He pioneered and became chairman of Jalansutra, a very popular culinary community in Indonesia. He also became a presenter in the culinary show Wisata Kuliner (Culinary Tour) on Trans TV. He was famous for his phrase "Pokoe maknyus!"

References

1950 births
2017 deaths
Indonesian writers
Indonesian journalists
Diponegoro University alumni
People from Surabaya